Azerbaijan Communist Party may refer to:
 Azerbaijan Communist Party (1920) (1920–1991), ruling party of the Azerbaijan Soviet Socialist Republic
 Azerbaijan Communist Party (1993), led by Haji Hajiyev
 New Generation Communist Party of Azerbaijan, led by Niyazi Rajabov
 United Communist Party of Azerbaijan, led by Sayad Sayadov